Rubens Nicola Glagliarde Junior also known as Rubens Nicola (born July 30, 1955 in São Paulo, Brazil) is a Brazilian former footballer who played for clubs in Brazil and Chile.

Career
Born in São Paulo, Brazil, Nicola moved to Chile in 1979. A striker with excellent technique, he played with great success for Rangers Talca, being remembered by ranguerinos by five goals in 1983 he scored a Colo-Colo two on the first wheel in the 2-1 win that  piducanos  obtained in the Estadio Nacional, and three in the second round in an unforgettable 5-2 in the Estadio Fiscal de Talca.

In 1984, Colo-Colo decides to hire managing to have good performances, despite the poor performance of the team in that year.

Presently living in Brazil, where he devoted himself to the care of a restaurant in the city of Cabo Frio, on the outskirts of Rio de Janeiro. Linked to football continues as Chairman of the Football League Cabofriense.

Teams
  Botafogo 1975-1976
  Olaria 1977
  Corinthians 1977
  Olaria 1978
  Ceará 1978
  Unión Española 1979-1980
  Everton 1981
  Cobresal 1982
  Rangers 1983
  Colo-Colo 1984
  Audax Italiano 1985
  Deportes Laja 1986
  Curicó Unido 1986

References

1955 births
Living people
Brazilian footballers
Brazilian expatriate footballers
Botafogo de Futebol e Regatas players
Sport Club Corinthians Paulista players
Olaria Atlético Clube players
Ceará Sporting Club players
Everton de Viña del Mar footballers
Rangers de Talca footballers
Unión Española footballers
Audax Italiano footballers
Colo-Colo footballers
Cobresal footballers
Deportes Laja footballers
Chilean Primera División players
Expatriate footballers in Chile
Brazilian expatriate sportspeople in Chile
Association football forwards
Footballers from São Paulo